Testudovolva is a genus of sea snails, marine gastropod mollusks in the family Ovulidae.

Species
Species within the genus Testudovolva include:
Testudovolva ericae (Cossignani & Calo, 2002)
Testudovolva intricata Cate, 1973
Testudovolva nebula (Azuma & Cate, 1971)
Testudovolva nipponensis (Pilsbry, 1913)
Testudovolva orientis Cate, 1973
Testudovolva pulchella H. Adams, 1874
 Synonymized species  
Testudovolva freemani (Liltved & Millard, 1994): synonym of Prionovolva freemani Liltved & Millard, 1994
Testudovolva quaestio Cate, 1973: synonym of Testudovolva intricata Cate, 1973
Testudovolva somaliensis Fehse, 2001 : synonym of  Margovula somaliensis (Fehse, 2001)

References

External links

Ovulidae